Anne van Amstel (born June 25, 1974) is a Dutch writer.

She was born in Hoogeveen and was educated at the Menso Alting College there, going on to study English literature and clinical psychology at the Vrije Universiteit Amsterdam. Van Amstel works part-time as a psychologist.

In 2004, she published her first poetry collection Het oog van de storm. In 2007, van Amstel was awarded first place for the VU-Podium Poëzieprijs. She has appeared at the  festival in Rotterdam, the Park & Poëzie festival in Middelburg, the Vurige Tongen festival in Ruigoord and the  festival in Groningen. In 2015, she received a scholarship awarded by the magazine Hollands Maandblad for the poetry category.

References

External links 
 

1974 births
Living people
Dutch women poets
People from Hoogeveen